The National Association of Democratic Professions (ANPD) was a small temporary organization in Bolivia. It was founded by Bolivian Socialist Falange in 1966 and took part in a FSB’s electoral coalition Christian Democratic Community.

After the coup d'état on 26 September 1969 the ANPD disappeared.

Notes

Defunct political parties in Bolivia
Political parties established in 1966
1966 establishments in Bolivia